Dokam Amya is a village in Itwa tehsil and district Siddharthnagar, Uttar Pradesh state of India.

Demographics 
As of 2011 Indian Census, Dokam Amya had a total population of 3074, out of which 1497 are male while 1577 are female. Population within the age group of 0 — 6 years was 656.

References 

Villages in Siddharthnagar district